"Mary and Willie" (sometimes spelled "Mary and Willi") is a song written and recorded by American country music  artist K. T. Oslin.  It was released in February 1991 as the third single from the album Love in a Small Town.  The song reached #28 on the Billboard Hot Country Singles & Tracks chart.

Chart performance

References

1991 singles
K. T. Oslin songs
Song recordings produced by Barry Beckett
Songs written by K. T. Oslin
RCA Records Nashville singles
1990 songs